Results from the 1952 Buenos Aires Grand Prix held in Buenos Aires on 9 March 1952, at the inauguration of the Autódromo Oscar Gálvez.

Classification

References

Buenos Aires Grand Prix
Buenos Aires Grand Prix
Buenos Aires Grand Prix